Kathleen Tessaro is an American novelist. She was born in Pittsburgh, Pennsylvania and attended the University of Pittsburgh and Carnegie Mellon University, where she was a member of their drama program. Katie Holmes stated in 2016 that she was adapting Tessaro's sixth book, Rare Objects, into a screenplay and hoped to direct the film. The film is currently in post-production with a release date set for April 14, 2023.

Bibliography 
 Elegance (2003, William Morrow)
 Innocence (2005, William Morrow)
 The Flirt (2007, William Morrow)
 The Debutante (2010, Harper)
 The Perfume Collector (2013, Harper)
 Rare Objects (2016, Harper)

References

External links
 

21st-century American novelists
Writers from Pittsburgh
Living people
1965 births
American women novelists
21st-century American women writers
University of Pittsburgh alumni
Carnegie Mellon University alumni
Novelists from Pennsylvania